Gaizka Saizar Lekuona (born 22 July 1980 in Oiartzun, Basque Country) is a Spanish former professional footballer who played as a forward.

References

External links

1980 births
Living people
People from Oiartzun
Spanish footballers
Footballers from the Basque Country (autonomous community)
Association football midfielders
Association football forwards
La Liga players
Segunda División players
Segunda División B players
Tercera División players
Antiguoko players
CE Sabadell FC footballers
RCD Espanyol B footballers
SD Eibar footballers
Gimnàstic de Tarragona footballers
Atlético Levante UD players
Ciudad de Murcia footballers
Granada 74 CF footballers
CD Tenerife players
SD Ponferradina players
Girona FC players
Racing de Santander players
Real Unión footballers
CD Castellón footballers